Il vecchio testamento, English title The Old Testament is a 1962 Italian/French widescreen international co-production epic shot in Yugoslavia that was based on the Maccabean revolt against the Syrians of 166 B.C. It was directed and co-written by Gianfranco Parolini and starred Brad Harris in one of their frequent collaborations.

Cast
In the American release several of the cast were credited with surnames of American actors who had appeared in Biblical films such "John (Charlton) Heston" and "Susan (Debra) Paget".

Brad Harris ...  Simon
Djordje Nenadovic ...  Judas Maccabeus
Ivano Staccioli ...Antiochus IV Epiphanes
Franca Parisi ...  Miza
Mara Lane ...  Diotima
Philippe Hersent ...  Namele
Carlo Tamberlani ...  Mattathias
Jacques Berthier ...  Apollonius, military commander of Seleucid Empire
Alan Steel

Notes

External links 

1962 films
1962 drama films
1960s action adventure films
Cultural depictions of the Maccabees
1960s Italian-language films
Peplum films
Films based on the deuterocanonical books
Films about religion
Religious epic films
Films directed by Gianfranco Parolini
Italian action adventure films
Films scored by Angelo Francesco Lavagnino
Sword and sandal films
1960s Italian films